Poimenesperus niveicollis is a species of beetle in the family Cerambycidae. It was described by Per Olof Christopher Aurivillius in 1903. It is known from Cameroon.

References

Endemic fauna of Cameroon
niveicollis
Beetles described in 1903